Cuthead Creek is a stream in Alberta, Canada. It is a tributary of the Cascade River.

The river's name comes from the Stoney Indians of the area, whose legend tells of a warrior who was beheaded near this creek.

See also
List of rivers of Alberta

References

Rivers of Alberta